Kennedy Nyauncho Osinde (18 August 1962 – 10 December 2021) was a Kenyan ambassador. He served as Ambassador of Kenya to Germany from 2010 to 2014.

References

1962 births
2021 deaths
Ambassadors of Kenya to Germany
Kenyan diplomats